The Crawford W. Brazell House in Vidalia, Georgia was built in 1911.  It is now the Altama Museum of Art and History.  Its collection includes Staffordshire porcelain, quadruped prints by John James Audubon, Southern art, bird prints, botanical art, wooden sculptures and a Girl Scout room.

The house was built by local builder/architect Ivey P. Crutchfield.  The house was listed on the National Register of Historic Places in 1982.

One way it is significant is as the only surviving (out of three) Neo-Classical houses that were built in Vidalia post-Reconstruction.

References

External links
Altama Museum of Art & History

National Register of Historic Places in Toombs County, Georgia
Neoclassical architecture in Georgia (U.S. state)
Houses completed in 1911
Houses in Toombs County, Georgia
History museums in Georgia (U.S. state)
Tourist attractions in Toombs County, Georgia